François Nicolas Léonard Buzot (1 March 176024 June 1794) was a French politician and leader of the French Revolution.

Biography

Early life
Born at Évreux, Eure, he studied Law, and, at the outbreak of the Revolution was a lawyer in his home town. In 1789 he was elected deputy to the Estates-General and there became known for his radical opinions. He demanded the nationalization of the possessions of the Roman Catholic Church, and the right of all citizens to bear arms.

After the dissolution of the National Constituent Assembly, Buzot returned to Évreux, where he was named president of the criminal tribunal.

Convention
In 1792 he was elected deputy to the National Convention, and joined the Girondists under the influence of his friend Madame Roland. Buzot entered a polemic with the main rival of the Girondists, Jean-Paul Marat, and demanded the formation of a National Guard from the départements to defend the Convention against the Paris crowds of sans-culottes. His proposal was carried, but never put into force - the Parisians subsequently singled him out as a target of their hatred.

In the trial of King Louis XVI, Buzot voted in favour of the capital punishment death, but with appeal to the people and postponement of sentence (sursis). He had a sentence of death passed against the Royalist émigrés who did not return to France, and against anyone who should demand the re-establishment of the monarchy. At the same time, he opposed Georges Danton and The Mountain, and rejected the creation of a Committee of Public Safety and Revolutionary Tribunal (but abstained when the question of Marat's trial before the Tribunal was brought up by the Girondists). On 5 May 1793 his servant was arrested in the Jardin du Luxembourg.

Flight and resistance
Proscribed with the Girondists on 2 June 1793, he escaped, and took refuge to Calvados in Normandy, where he contributed to organize a Girondist insurrection against the convention, which was suppressed soon after.

The Convention prosecuted him, and decreed "that the house occupied by Buzot be demolished, and never to be rebuilt on this plot. [Instead,] a column shall be raised, on which there shall be written: "Here was the sanctuary of the villain Buzot who, while a representative of the people, conspired for the overthrow of the French Republic"". He fled, together with Jérôme Pétion de Villeneuve, to Saint-Émilion, near Bordeaux and remained in hiding. Both of them committed suicide; their bodies were found in a field a week later, half-eaten by dogs.

He left behind his Memoirs, first published in 1823.

References

1760 births
1794 deaths
People from Évreux
Jacobins
Girondins
Members of the National Constituent Assembly (France)
Deputies to the French National Convention
Politicians from Normandy
18th-century French lawyers
French politicians who committed suicide
Suicides by firearm in France
French male non-fiction writers
18th-century suicides
18th-century French memoirists